The thirty-third edition of the ATP Masters Series. The champion of each Masters event is awarded a 1,000 rankings points.

Tournaments

Results

Tournament details

Indian Wells Masters

Singles

Doubles

Miami Open

Singles

Doubles

Monte Carlo Masters

Singles

Doubles

Madrid Open

Singles

Doubles

Italian Open

Singles

Doubles

Canadian Open

Singles

Doubles

Cincinnati Masters

Singles

Doubles

Shanghai Masters

Paris Masters

Singles

Doubles

See also 
 ATP Tour Masters 1000
 2022 ATP Tour
 2022 WTA 1000 tournaments
 2022 WTA Tour

References

External links 
 Association of Tennis Professionals (ATP) official website
 International Tennis Federation (ITF) official website

ATP Tour Masters 1000